The following is a list of attractions in Ottawa, Ontario, Canada and surrounding area.

Permanent attractions

Museums

 Billings Estate National Historic Site
 Bytown Museum
 Cameron Highlanders of Ottawa Museum
 Canada Agriculture Museum
 Canada Aviation and Space Museum
 Canada Science and Technology Museum
 Canadian Museum of History - located in Gatineau, includes the Canadian Children's Museum
 Canadian Museum of Nature
 Canadian War Museum
 City of Ottawa Art Galleries - includes ASP, Barbara Ann Scott, Centrepointe Theatre, City Hall, Gallery 112, Karsh-Masson, Studio and Trinity galleries
 Currency Museum - in the Bank of Canada
 Diefenbunker - at CFS Carp
 Governor General's Foot Guards Regimental Museum
 Laurier House
 Muséoparc Vanier Museopark
 National Gallery of Canada
 Nepean Museum
 Ottawa Art Gallery
 Ottawa Sports Hall of Fame
 Pinhey's Point Historic Site
 Portrait Gallery of Canada
 Swords and Ploughshares Museum
 Watson's Mill
 Workers’ History Museum

Defunct museums
 Canada and the World Pavilion
 Canadian Museum of Contemporary Photography - closed in 2006, collections now at the National Gallery of Canada
 Canadian Postal Museum - closed in 2012
 Canadian Ski Museum - moved to Mont Tremblant, Quebec 2013
 Wheelhouse Maritime Museum (1968-1976) - collection transferred to Canadian Museum of Science and Technology from 1976-1990, then Marine Museum of the Great Lakes in 1990

Children attractions
Canadian Children's Museum

Other public areas
 Byward Market
 Canadian Tribute to Human Rights
 Capital Pathway
 Dominion Arboretum
 Dow's Lake
 Lansdowne Park  -home of the Aberdeen Pavilion and Frank Clair Stadium
 National Arts Centre
 National War Memorial  - also called "The Response", home of the Canadian Tomb of the Unknown Soldier
 Parliament Hill
 Peacekeeping Monument
 Rideau Canal
 Royal Canadian Navy Monument

Notable buildings and private areas
Some of these places allow members of the public to visit, but are not completely open to everyone.

 24 Sussex Drive
 Britannia Yacht Club
 Delegation of the Ismaili Imamat
 Global Centre for Pluralism
 Library and Archives Canada
 Nepean Sailing Club
 Ottawa Hunt and Golf Club
 Rideau Hall
 Royal Canadian Mint
 STV Black Jack
 Supreme Court of Canada

Festivals and other events

Canada Dance Festival
Canadian Tulip Festival
Capital Hoedown
Capital Idea!
Capital Pride
Carnival of Cultures
Festival of India, Ottawa
Inside Out Film and Video Festival
International Folkloric Festival
Juno Awards of 2012, 2017
Latin Sparks Festival
Maple Sugar Festival
Music and Beyond
Ottawa Bluesfest
Ottawa Chamberfest
Ottawa Dragon Boat Race Festival
Ottawa Folk Festival
Ottawa Fringe Festival
Ottawa International Animation Festival
Ottawa International Children's Festival
Ottawa International Film Festival
Ottawa International Hockey Festival
Ottawa International Jazz Festival
Ottawa International Writers Festival
Ottawa Irish Festival
Ottawa Reggae Festival
Rideau Canal Festival
Westfest
Winterlude

Map of major buildings

A map of downtown Ottawa, including parts of Lower Town, Sandy Hill, and downtown Hull.
Click on the stars to read articles on individual buildings.

References

External links
 
National Capital Commission - Discover the Capital
Ottawa Festivals d’Ottawa
ottawakiosk.com: Ottawa attractions

 
Ottawa
Attractions